Dasht-e Laleh Rural District is a rural district (dehestan) in Asir District, Mohr County, Fars Province, Iran. At the 2006 census, its population was 4,471, in 900 families.  The rural district has 28 villages.

References 

Rural Districts of Fars Province
Mohr County